Nasakhma (Nasakhmaqa) was a Kushite King of Meroe. He was the successor of king Siaspiqa.

Nasakhma was succeeded by Malewiebamani, who may have been his eldest son. It is possible that Talakhamani was a younger son of Nasakhma who took the throne after his brother Malewiebamani. Another possibility is that Talakhamani is Malewiebamani's son and thus possibly Nasakhma's grandson.

Nasakhma was buried at Nuri (Nu. 19). The Boston Museum of Fine Arts holds several objects that may belong to Nasakhma: shabtis, vessel fragments, etc. excavated form his tomb.

References

5th-century BC monarchs of Kush